Anže (Archaic nominative: Anza) is a Slovene given name. Notable people with the given name include:
 Anže Berčič (born 1990), Slovenian slalom canoeist
 Anže Jelar (born 1991), Slovenian footballer
 Anže Kopitar (born 1987), Slovenian professional ice hockey player
 Anže Košnik (born 1991), Slovenian footballer
 Anže Kuralt (born 1991), Slovenian ice hockey player
 Anže Lanišek (born 1996), Slovenian ski jumper
 Anže Semenič (born 1993), Slovenian ski jumper
 Anže Šetina (born 1986), Slovenian skeleton racer
 Anže Tavčar (born 1994), Slovenian swimmer
 Anže Zorc (born 1994), Slovenian footballer

See also
 Anže, Krško
 Anze County

Slovene masculine given names